Craig Armstrong may refer to:

Craig Armstrong (composer) (born 1959), Scottish composer of modern orchestral music, electronica and film scores 
Craig Armstrong (footballer) (born 1975), English footballer, turned manager

See also
Armstrong (disambiguation)